

This is a list of the National Register of Historic Places listings in Rock Hill, South Carolina.

This is intended to be a complete list of the properties and districts on the National Register of Historic Places in Rock Hill, South Carolina, United States.  The locations of National Register properties and districts for which the latitude and longitude coordinates are included below, may be seen on a map.

There are 59 properties and districts listed on the National Register in York County. The city of Rock Hill is the location of 28 of these properties and districts, they are listed here, while the 29 properties and districts in the remaining parts of the county are listed separately.

Current listings

|}

References

 
Rock Hill
Rock Hill, South Carolina